An electric tricycle is a tricycle with an electric motor.

Electric tricycle, electric trike, or electric three-wheeler may also refer to:
 Three-wheeled electric motorcycles and scooters
 Three-wheeled electric rickshaw
 Three-wheeled mobility scooter

See also
 Electric vehicle
 Tricycle
 Velomobile